Glenties railway station served the village of Glenties in County Donegal, Ireland.

The station opened on 3 June 1895 when the Donegal Railway Company opened their line from Glenties to Stranorlar.

It closed on 15 December 1947 when the County Donegal Railways Joint Committee closed the line from Glenties to Stranorlar in an effort to save money.

Freight services on the route continued until 10 March 1952.

Routes

References

Disused railway stations in County Donegal
Glenties
Railway stations opened in 1895
Railway stations closed in 1947